is a manga series written and illustrated by Osamu Tezuka, published in Akita Shoten's Weekly Shōnen Champion from March 1973 to September 1973. It was later adapted into an anime series by Toei.

The anime adaption of Tezuka's manga , replaced the letter "Z" with an "S" as to match the initial letter of the show’s sponsor, Seiko. It consisted of 26 episodes and was originally broadcast on TV Asahi.

Cast 
 Makio Inoue as Yanma
 Hiroko Suzuki as Ageha
 Machiko Soga as Mamezo
 Yasuaki Suzuki as Dr. Midoro
 Ichirô Nagai as Gidoron
 Jouji Yanami as Teacher Noracura
 Kaneta Kimotsuki as Kankuro
 Masako Nozawa as Manabu
 Kei Tomiyama as Ruriboshi

References

External links
 Microsuperman (manga) at Tezuka official website
 Microsuperman (anime) at Tezuka official website
 

1973 anime television series debuts
Toei Animation television
TV Asahi original programming
Osamu Tezuka manga
Osamu Tezuka anime
Superheroes in anime and manga
1973 Japanese television series endings
Anime series based on manga
Akita Shoten manga